Monte Bondone is a mountain of Trentino, northern Italy, located west of the provincial capital of Trento. It is the highest mountain of the Garda Prealps and with a prominence of  qualifies as an Ultra. It lies between the Etschtal valley in the east and the Sarca valley in the west. Due to its location high above the city, it is often called the mountain of Trento.

References

External links 
 Monte Bondone tourist promotional agency website 

Mountains of Trentino
Mountains of the Alps